Khomenko (Cyrillic: Хоменко) a Ukrainian language surname derived from the given name Khoma, or Thomas.

Notable people with this surname include:

Ilya Khomenko
Oleksiy Khomenko
Vasily Khomenko
Volodymyr Khomenko

See also
 

Ukrainian-language surnames
Patronymic surnames